Ludovic Auger (born 17 February 1971 in Joigny) is a French former professional road bicycle racer. In his 14-year career, he rode for BigMat–Auber 93 from 1994 until 2004 and then for UCI ProTeam Française des Jeux from 2005 to 2007.

Major results

 Tour de la Manche – 1 stage & Overall (2004)
 Tour de Normandie – Overall (2000)
 GP Fina - Fayt-le-Franc (1998)
 Solidarity Tour – 1 stage (1997)
 2nd, National U19 Road Race Championship (1989)

External links 

1971 births
Living people
People from Joigny
French male cyclists
Sportspeople from Yonne
Cyclists from Bourgogne-Franche-Comté